Paschal Miller House is a historic home located at Morristown in St. Lawrence County, New York.  It is a -story rectangular frame structure with a hipped roof, built in 1838–1843 in the Greek Revival style. The house features a wraparound porch along three sides.  Also on the property is a contributing carriage barn.

It was listed on the National Register of Historic Places in 1982.

References

Houses on the National Register of Historic Places in New York (state)
Greek Revival houses in New York (state)
Houses completed in 1843
Houses in St. Lawrence County, New York
1843 establishments in New York (state)
National Register of Historic Places in St. Lawrence County, New York